Alexander Krull (born 31 July 1970) is a German musician who is the lead vocalist for metal band Atrocity, as well as backing vocalist in the band Leaves' Eyes.

Biography 
Krull was born in Ludwigsburg, where he formed Atrocity in 1985. He has also worked as a music producer for Elis, Leaves' Eyes, and Erben der Schöpfung. He uses the Mastersound Studio for his recording work with the bands.

Personal life

Krull was married to Liv Kristine of the Norwegian gothic metal band Theatre of Tragedy on 3 July 2003. Kristine gave birth to their first and only son the same year in December. The couple split in January 2016.

Krull's sister Yasmin has performed as guest singer with Atrocity on two projects and works as a Celtic folk singer.

References

External links
 
 

1970 births
21st-century German male singers
German heavy metal singers
German keyboardists
German record producers
Living people
People from Ludwigsburg
Leaves' Eyes members